Gimlekollen NLA College is a private branch institution of NLA University College located in Gimlekollen in Kristiansand, Norway. It focuses on journalism, media, and communication. The school was established in 1981, became a college in 1996, and was affiliated with NLA University College on January 1, 2013. NLA University College is owned by six Christian organizations and a church community, and it is based on Christian values. The college is accredited by the Norwegian Agency for Quality Assurance in Education and is open to anyone regardless of life orientation.

The institution offers a bachelor's degrees in journalism, IT and communications, intercultural communication, and communication and life orientation, as well as an English-language master's degree in global journalism. The institution, which has about 200 students, educates 10 to 20% of all journalists in Norway. NLA University College also operates the company Damaris Norge through a special framework; it is primarily associated with communication and philosophy of life. Damaris Norge is also located in Gimlekollen in Kristiansand.

The college is part of the Gimlekollen Media Center, which also includes the production companies Sanden Media and Norea Mediemisjon.

Chancellors
 Asbjørn Kvalbein, 1981–1990
 Geir Sandvik, 1990–1996
 Knut Sigurd Aasebø, 1996–2002
 Hans Aage Gravaas, 2002–2008
 Lars Dahle, 2008–2012
 Since 2013 the institution has had no chancellor, but Lars Dahle has served as deputy chancellor (site manager).

References

External links
 Gimlekollen NLA College homepage 
 Sørnett – Online newspaper produced by students at Gimlekollen NLA College

Christian schools in Norway
Educational institutions established in 1981
1981 establishments in Norway